David Christie was a Scottish amateur footballer who played in the Scottish League for Queen's Park and Leith Athletic as an inside forward. He was capped by Scotland at amateur level.

References 

Association football inside forwards
Scottish footballers
Queen's Park F.C. players
Scottish Football League players
Scotland amateur international footballers
Year of birth missing
Year of death missing
Place of birth missing
Edinburgh University A.F.C. players
Leith Athletic F.C. players